The Disabled Sailors Association (DSA) also known as the Thomas Morley Trust is a registered charity in Hampshire, England. It was set up in 1993 to provide ocean sailing for disabled people in its purpose designed and built cruising yachts and inland dinghy sailing in Martin 16 keel boats and WETA trimarans. DSA has developed into an umbrella or holding charity for a number of projects.

RoRo Sailing Project

Since 1995 RoRo has provided ocean sailing facilities for disabled people. The funds were raised through Grant Making Trusts, enabling the design and built of two 11 meter wheelchair accessible ocean cruising yachts Spirit of Scott Bader and Verity K. Both yachts are based in Portsmouth.

Martin16 sailing

Canadian designed and built dinghies are quite common in North America but were unknown in Europe until DSA started importing them. The Martin16 provides access to the inland waters for disabled and disadvantaged. They have been used for the British Paralympic team members to practice, and as a training boat for disabled engaged on ambitious long range sailing projects.

The WETA trimaran

The WETA trimaran was launched on the New Zealand market in 2007. The boat is lightweight, quick and easy to rig and packs up to be the size of a Laser for storage. The WETA trimaran class allows seats and alternative steering to be fitted and is suited for sailing by  mature, disabled or very young people.

DSA boats provide:
  facilities for any disability including wheelchair users and those needing blow and suck controls
  day sailing on wheelchair accessible yachts
  long distance cruising
  dinghy sailing on dinghies fitted with seats
  dinghy racing at international level

References

External links
 Disabled Sailing
 Sail Ability International
 Martin 16 - Accessible Sailing
 WETA
 Sail WETA

Parasports organizations
Disability organisations based in the United Kingdom
Disabled boating
Charities based in Hampshire